Laat (Sindhi  لاٽ) is a children's magazine in Sindhi published by Mehran Publication Hyderabad, Sindh. It started in 1988 and got immediate attention of Sindhi children. It was founded by Altaf Malkani and Zulfiqar Ali Bhatti. It contains short stories, poems, articles and many more things of interest to the children.

See also
 Waskaro (Children's Magazine)
 Gul Phul

References

1988 establishments in Pakistan
Magazines established in 1988
Children's magazines published in Pakistan
Sindhi children's magazines